The Meadfoot Group is an early Devonian lithostratigraphic group (a sequence of rock strata) in south Devon in southwest England. The name is derived from the locality of Meadfoot at Torquay. The Group comprises (in ascending order i.e. oldest first) the Staddon and Bovisand formations. It was formerly known as the Meadfoot Beds or Series.

References

Devonian System of Europe
Geology of England
Geological groups of the United Kingdom